Loganathan Arumugam (15 July 1953 – 4 June 2007), better known as Loga, was a Malaysian musician and singer who was one of the founding members of the band Alleycats. Loga was one of the lead singers of Alleycats along with his elder brother David. Dato Loganathan Arumugam died from lung cancer at the Mount Miriam Hospital on 4 June 2007. He left behind 2 children, Vigneshwaran Loganathan and Priyadashini Loganathan, and his wife, Susan Lovie. Datuk Loganathan Arumugam was conferred the Darjah Indera Mahkota Pahang (DIMP) award which carries the title of "Dato" in conjunction with Sultan Ahmad Shah of Pahang's 78th birthday on 24 October 2008.

References

1953 births
2007 deaths
Malaysian people of Indian descent
Malaysian male pop singers
People from Penang
Malaysian people of Tamil descent
Malay-language singers
20th-century Malaysian male singers
Malaysian pop rock singers
Malaysian folk singers
Deaths from lung cancer in Malaysia